Rhopalodinidae is a family of sea cucumbers belonging to the order Dendrochirotida.

Genera:
 Rhopalodina Gray, 1853
 Rhopalodinaria Cherbonnier, 1970
 Rhopalodinopsis Heding, 1937

References

Dendrochirotida
Echinoderm families